Jetait is a locality southwest of Granville Lake. The Canadian Board on Geographical Names (CBGN) records (1953) indicated this to be a Canadian National Railway point, named by the CNR after World War I casualty Captain James Edward Tait who was awarded the Military Cross and the Victoria Cross for his "conspicuous bravery" at the Battle of Amiens (1918). He had worked on the original surveys for the Hudson Bay Railway.

External links 

Localities in Manitoba